The Garden City Northern Railway  line ran from Garden City to Shallow Water, Kansas about . This trackage was originally built by the Garden City, Gulf and Northern Railway (GCG&N) on January 4, 1907. In July 1911, the GCG&N and its entire line came under Atchison, Topeka and Santa Fe Railway (ATSF) control.  The ATSF operated the line until September 7, 1989, when GCN took over the line.  The GCN was combined with parent Garden City Western Railway in September 1991.

Defunct Kansas railroads
Railway companies established in 1989
Railway companies disestablished in 1991